Houston A.P. (Pat) Bassett (March 14, 1857 – July 17, 1920) was an African-American Republican politician who served in the Twentieth Texas Legislature.  The son of poor farmers, Bassett lived in his native Grimes County, Texas, for most of his life.  He was educated at Straight University in New Orleans, Louisiana ,and  Fisk University in Nashville, Tennessee. Upon returning to Texas, he became involved in politics and won a contested election for the Texas House of Representatives in 1886.  He served only one term.  He and his wife, the former Cordelia Foster, had four children.

References
Texas Legislators: Past & Present - Houston A.P. Bassett
Handbook of Texas Online - Houston A.P. Bassett
Forever Free: Nineteenth Century African-American Legislators and Constitutional Convention Delegates of Texas

Republican Party members of the Texas House of Representatives
1857 births
1920 deaths
People from Grimes County, Texas
African-American state legislators in Texas
African-American politicians during the Reconstruction Era
Straight University alumni
Fisk University alumni
Baptists from Texas
19th-century Baptists
20th-century African-American people